Microclanis is a genus of moths in the family Sphingidae, containing one species, Microclanis erlangeri, which is known from arid bush from central Tanzania to eastern and northern Kenya, Ethiopia and Somalia.

References

Smerinthini
Monotypic moth genera
Moths of Africa
Taxa named by Robert Herbert Carcasson